Gradinja or Gradihna (1125–46) was the ruler of Duklja, from either 1131 to 1142 or 1135 to 1146. Gradinja is one of many persons (alongside Branislav, Gojislav, Georgije and Grubeša among others) mentioned only in the Chronicle of the Priest of Duklja (CPD), not found in Byzantine sources as the other Serbian rulers and royalty.  Gradinja was the son of Dukljan prince Branislav, and the brother of Grubeša, the former ruler (r. 1118–25).

Around 1125, Gradinja, the rival of Đorđe, married himself in Raška (Grand Principality of Serbia), with the "intent of returning the rule", according to Mavro Orbini. Following the second war with the Byzantines, in which King Đorđe was defeated and imprisoned in the stronghold of Oblik, the Byzantines appointed Gradinja as ruler of Duklja, to rule as a vassal. According to the CPD, Gradinja was gentle, tame, compassionate and a protector of the widows and the poor. The power and territorial extent of Duklja was, in the time of his reign, greatly decreased. His son Radoslav inherited the throne in 1146.

Gradinja was according to Gavro Škrivanić buried in the Church of Saints Sergius and Bacchus in Bojana.

See also
 Duklja
 Vojislavljević dynasty
 Vukanović dynasty
 Grand Principality of Serbia

References

Sources

 
 
 
 
 
 
 
 

12th-century rulers in Europe
12th-century Serbian nobility
12th-century Byzantine people
Rulers of Duklja
Vojislavljević dynasty
Pretenders
12th-century deaths
People of the Grand Principality of Serbia